Chloé is an 1875 oil painting by French academic painter Jules Joseph Lefebvre. Measuring 260 cm by 139 cm, it depicts the naiad in "Mnasyle et Chloé", a poem by the 18th-century French poet André Chénier. 

The painting hangs in the Young and Jackson Hotel in Melbourne, Australia, where it has been since 1909. One of the most popular paintings on display in Melbourne, Chloé is considered an icon of the city, and was the mascot of the Royal Navy frigate .

History

Chloé made its debut at the Paris Salon 1875, where it drew critical praise. It was subsequently displayed in Australia at the 1879 Sydney International Exhibition and the Melbourne International Exhibition.

Chloé was then purchased by Dr Thomas Fitzgerald of Lonsdale Street, Melbourne, for 850 guineas. Fitzgerald loaned the painting to the National Gallery of Victoria. In 1883, controversy arose when the painting was to be exhibited on Sundays, so Fitzgerald withdrew Chloé from the gallery. In response artist Alexander Colquhoun, in satyrical verse at The Buonarotti Club that year, urged the Victorian National Gallery to rehang the painting. Upon Fitzgerald's death in 1908, the painting was purchased at auction by Henry Figsby Young, owner of the Young and Jackson Hotel. In 1908, Young installed the painting in the hotel's saloon bar.

Influence on soldiers
Chloé captivated many soldiers who frequented the bar of Young and Jackson's Hotel during World War I, World War II, the Korean War and the Vietnam War. Letters were addressed to her from the trenches in Turkey, France, and Papua New Guinea, promising to return to her. American soldiers even went as far as coming up with a plan to abduct her.

Identity of the model
The model who posed for the painting has been the subject of much speculation and mythologising, with many accounts depicting her as having had a love affair with Lefebvre, and committing suicide after he declined to marry her. Such stories are believed to be the result of many decades of bar-room gossip at the Young and Jackson Hotel.

An ardent admirer of Chloé since its debut at the 1875 Paris Salon, American journalist Lucy Hamilton Hooper travelled to Lefebvre's studio to ask him about the painting. She quoted him as saying that, after completing the painting, he traveled abroad for a few months, and on his return learned that the model had died:

The only other first-hand account of the model, and her possible identity, is Irish writer George Moore's in his 1886 memoir Confessions of a Young Man. According to Moore, the model's name was Marie, and he met her through the Symbolist painter Louis Welden Hawkins. According to Moore, "no one knew why" the model committed suicide, but said there were rumors it was due to unrequited love.

Exhibitions
 Paris Salon Exhibition, 1875 
 Sydney International Exhibition, 1879 
 Melbourne International Exhibition (1880)
 Adelaide Gallery Exhibition, 1883 - 1886
 Blamey House Women's Auxiliary 
 Fundraiser, 1940 
 National Gallery of Victoria 1883, 1995, 2000

Awards
 1879 – Won highest award at the Sydney International Exhibition
 1880 – Won highest award at the Melbourne International Exhibition

Damage and restoration
On Friday, 24 September 2004, at 8:30 pm, a hotel patron fell against the painting and caused long vertical cracks in its -thick protective glass. Art experts said the damage was minor and would not affect the overall value of the painting. It was repaired at the Ian Potter Conservation Centre in the Ian Potter Museum of Art in Melbourne, where it waited for protective German glass to be imported, and was restored to the hotel bar on 13 October 2004.

Young and Jackson Hotel
Chloé is to remain part of the hotel forever, as decided by the National Trust and Heritage of Victoria in 1988.

References

Arts in Melbourne
Tourist attractions in Melbourne
Obscenity controversies in painting
1875 paintings